Hamidou Traoré (born 7 October 1996) is a Malian professional footballer who plays as a midfielder for Serbian side Partizan. He has also represented Mali at senior level.

References

External links
fr.cafonline.com

1996 births
Living people
Malian footballers
Mali international footballers
Malian expatriate footballers
TFF First League players
Elazığspor footballers
Kardemir Karabükspor footballers
Adana Demirspor footballers
Expatriate footballers in Turkey
Association football wingers
CO de Bamako players
2021 Africa Cup of Nations players
Malian expatriate sportspeople in Turkey
21st-century Malian people
Mali A' international footballers
2014 African Nations Championship players
Expatriate footballers in Serbia
FK Partizan players